St. Andrew's Church, Church of St Andrew, or variants thereof, may refer to:

Albania 
 St. Andrew's Church, Himarë

Australia

New South Wales 
 St Andrew's Anglican Church, Seven Hills
 St Andrew's Anglican Church, Walcha
 St Andrew's Anglican Rectory, Walcha
 St Andrew's Presbyterian Church, Wingham

Queensland 
 St Andrews Anglican Church, South Brisbane
 St Andrews Church, Ormiston, Redland City
 St Andrews Church Hall, Indooroopilly, Brisbane
 St. Andrew's Church, Toogoolawah, Somerset Region
 St Andrew's Church Hall, Toogoolawah, Somerset Region
 St Andrew's Rectory, Toogoolawah, Somerset Region
 St Andrews Presbyterian Church, Esk, Somerset Region
 St Andrew's Uniting Church, Brisbane
 St Andrews Uniting Church, Bundaberg, Bundaberg Region

South Australia
 St Andrew's Church, Walkerville, Adelaide, which founded St Andrew's School; see George Dove

Victoria 
 St Andrew's Church, Brighton, Melbourne

Belgium 
 St. Andrew's Church, Antwerp
 St Andrew's Church, Brussels

Belize 
 St. Andrew's Church (Belize City)
 St. Andrew's Anglican Church (San Ignacio)

Canada 

 St Andrews Church, Kingston, Ontario
 St. Andrew's Church (Thunder Bay), Ontario
 St. Andrew's Church (Toronto), Ontario
 St. Andrew's Evangelical Lutheran Church (Toronto), Ontario
 St. Andrew's United Church, Toronto, Ontario
 Church of St. Andrew and St. Paul, Montreal, Quebec
 St. Andrew's Church (Quebec City), Quebec

China

Hong Kong 
 St Andrew's Church, Kowloon, Tsim Sha Tsui, Kowloon, Hong Kong (Anglican)
 St. Andrew's Church, Hang Hau, Tseung Kwan O, Hong Kong (Catholic)

Denmark 
 St. Andrew's Church, Copenhagen

Egypt 
 St. Andrew's United Church in Cairo

Germany 
 St. Andreas, Hildesheim, Lower Saxony
 St. Andreas Church, Cologne, North Rhine-Westphalia
 St. Andreas, Düsseldorf, North Rhine-Westphalia
 St. Andrew's Church, Lübbecke, North Rhine-Westphalia
 St Andrew's Church, Erfurt, Thuringia

Greece 
 Saint Andrew of Patras

Guyana 
 St. Andrew's Kirk, Georgetown

India 
 St. Andrew's Church, Bangalore
 St Andrew's Church, Chennai
 St. Andrew's Church, Mumbai
 St Andrew's Church, Kovilthottam
 St. Andrew's Church, Puducherry

Ireland 
 St. Andrew's Church, Westland Row, Dublin

Israel 
 St Andrew's Church, Jerusalem

Italy 
 St Andrew's Church, Rome
 Sant'Andrea, Acquaviva
 Sant'Andrea, Capri
 Sant'Andrea degli Scozzesi

Malta 
 St. Andrew's Scots Church, Malta
 St Andrew's Parish Church, Luqa
 St Andrew's Chapel, Żurrieq

Morocco 
 St Andrew's Church, Tangier

New Zealand
 St Andrew's First Presbyterian Church, Auckland
 St Andrew's Church, Christchurch

Pakistan 
 St. Andrew's Church, Karachi
 St. Andrew's Church, Lahore

Philippines 
 Bacarra Church, Ilocos Norte
 Saint Andrew the Apostle Church, Municipality of Bugallon, Pangasinan
 Parañaque Cathedral, Parañaque City
 Saint Andrew the Apostle Church, Makati

Poland 
 St. Andrew's Church, Kraków

Russia 
 St. Andrew's Anglican Church, Moscow, Russia

Singapore 
 St Andrew's Cathedral, Singapore

Sri Lanka 
 St. Andrew's Presbyterian Church, Colombo

Ukraine 
 St Andrew's Church, Kyiv

United Kingdom

England

Berkshire 
 St Andrew's Church, Sonning
 St Andrew's Church, Bradfield

Cambridgeshire 
 St Andrew's Church, Steeple Gidding
 St Andrew's Church, Woodwalton
 St Andrew's Church, Orwell

Cheshire 
 St Andrew's Church, Chester
 St Andrew's Church, Tarvin

Cornwall 
 St Andrew's Church, Stratton

Cumbria 
 St Andrew's Church, Aikton
 St Andrew's Church, Crosby Garrett
 St Andrew's Church, Dacre
 St Andrew's Church, Dent
 St Andrew's Church, Penrith
 St Andrew's Church, Sedbergh

Derbyshire 
 St Andrew's Church, Radbourne

Devon 
 St Andrew's Church, Alwington
 St Andrew's Church, Bere Ferrers
 St Andrew's Church, Cullompton
 St Andrew's Church, Plymouth
 St Andrew's Church, South Huish

Dorset 
 St Andrew's Church, Bridport
 St. Andrew's Church, Kinson
 St. Andrew's Church, Richmond Hill

East Sussex 
 St Andrew's Church, Alfriston
 St Andrew's Church, Bishopstone
 St Andrew's Church, Church Road, Hove (the original parish church)
 St Andrew's Church, Waterloo Street, Hove (serving the Brunswick Town estate)

Essex 
 Greensted Church, Greensted-juxta-Ongar
 St Andrew's Church, Marks Tey
 St Andrew's Church, Willingale

Hampshire 
 St Andrew's Garrison Church, Aldershot

Hertfordshire 
 St Andrew's Church, Buckland

Isle of Wight 
 St Andrew's Church, Chale

Kent 
 St Andrew's Church, Paddock Wood

Lancashire 
 St Andrew's Church, Ashton-on-Ribble
 St Andrew's Church, Blackburn
 St Andrew's Church, Burnley
 St Andrew's Church, Leyland
 St Andrew's Church, Slaidburn

Leicestershire 
 St Andrew's Church, Aylestone

Lincolnshire 
 St Andrew's Church, Folkingham
 St. Andrew's Church, Lincoln
 St Andrew's Church, Rippingale

London 
 St Andrew's, Croydon
 St Andrew's, Earlsfield
 St Andrew's Enfield
 St. Andrew's Church, Fulham
 Old St Andrew's Church, Kingsbury
 St Andrew's Church, Haverstock Hill
 St Andrew's Church, Hornchurch
 St Andrew's Church, Ham
 St Andrew's Church, Holborn
 St Andrew's Southgate
 St Andrew, Stoke Newington
 St Andrew's Church, Surbiton
 St Andrew's church, Totteridge
 St Andrew's Church, Uxbridge
 St Andrew-by-the-Wardrobe
 St Andrew Undershaft
 St Andrew's Church, Willesden

Merseyside 
 St Andrew's Church, Bebington
 St Andrew's Church, Liverpool (in ruins)
 St Andrew's Church, West Kirby

Norfolk 
 St Andrew's Church, Barton Bendish
 St Andrew's Church, Congham
 St Andrew's Church, Frenze
 St Andrew's Church, Gunton
 St Andrew's Church, Hempstead
 St Andrew's Church, Holme Hale
 St Andrew's Church, Little Snoring
 St Andrew's Church, Northwold
 St Andrew's Church, Norwich
 St Andrew's Church, Quidenham
 St Andrew's Church, Tottington
 St Andrew's Church, Walpole
 St Andrew's Church, West Bradenham
 St Andrew's Church, West Dereham

Northamptonshire 
 St Andrew's Church, Cranford
 St Andrew's Church, Yardley Hastings

Northumberland 
 St Andrew's Church, Bywell
 St Andrew's Church, Shotley

Nottinghamshire 
 St Andrew's Church, Caunton
 St Andrew's Church, Langar
 St Andrew's Church, Skegby
 St Andrew's Church, Nottingham

Oxfordshire 
 St Andrew's Church, Oxford
 St Andrew's Church, Headington
 St Andrew's Church, Shrivenham; see Jacob Pleydell-Bouverie, 2nd Earl of Radnor

Shropshire 
 St Andrew's Church, Great Ness
 St Andrew's Church, Wroxeter

Somerset 
 St Andrew's Church, Backwell
 St Andrew's Church, Banwell
 St Andrew's Church, Brympton
 St Andrew's Church, Burnham-on-Sea
 St Andrew's Church, Cheddar
 St Andrew's Church, Chew Magna
 St Andrew's Church, Chew Stoke
 St Andrew's Church, Clevedon
 St Andrew's Church, Compton Bishop
 St Andrew's Church, Congresbury
 St Andrew's Church, Curry Rivel 
 St Andrew's Church, High Ham
 St Andrew's Church, Mells
 St Andrew's Church, Old Cleeve
 St Andrew's Church, Stogursey
 St Andrew's Church, Whitestaunton

Staffordshire 
 Church of St Andrew, Clifton Campville

Suffolk 
 St. Andrew's Church, Bramfield
 St Andrew's Church, Covehithe
 St Andrew's Church, Sapiston

Surrey 
 St Andrew's Church, Farnham
 St Andrew's Church, Goldsworth Park
 St Andrew's Church, Kingswood

Tyne and Wear 
 St Andrew's Church, Roker, Sunderland

Warwickshire
 St Andrew's Church, Rugby

West Midlands 
 Church of St Andrew, Netherton
 St Andrew's Church, West Bromwich

West Sussex 
 St Andrew's Church, Tangmere
 St Andrew's Church, West Tarring
 St Andrew's Church, Worthing

Wiltshire 
 Church of St Andrew, Boscombe, Wiltshire
 St Andrew's Church, Castle Combe
 St Andrew's Church, Chippenham
 Church of St Andrew, Great Durnford
 Church of St Andrew, Ogbourne St Andrew
 St Andrew's Church, Rollestone
 St Andrew's Church, Wanborough
 St Andrew's Church, Wootton Rivers

Yorkshire 
 St Andrew's Church, Aysgarth, North Yorkshire
 Church of St Andrew, Grinton, North Yorkshire
 St Andrew's Church, Starbeck, North Yorkshire
 St Andrew's Roundhay United Reformed Church, Leeds, West Yorkshire

Scotland 
 St Andrew's Church, Perth
 St Andrew's and St George's Church, Edinburgh
 St Andrew's-by-the-Green, Glasgow
 St Andrew's in the Square, Glasgow
 St Andrew's Parish Church, Arbroath, Angus
 St Andrew's West, Falkirk

Gibraltar 
 St Andrew's Church, Gibraltar

Wales 
 St Andrews United Reformed Church, Roath, Cardiff
 St Andrew's Church, Bayvil, Pembrokeshire
 St Andrew's Church, Presteigne, Powys
 St Andrew's Church, St. Andrews Major, Vale of Glamorgan
 Eglwys Dewi Sant, Cardiff, previously St Andrews (until 1956)

United States 

 St. Andrew's Catholic Church (Pasadena, California)
 Cathedral Church of Saint Andrew (Honolulu), Hawaii
 St. Andrew's Church (Newcastle, Maine)
 St. Andrew's Church (Leonardtown, Maryland)
 St. Andrew's Church (New York City), in Manhattan
 St. Andrew's Church (Staten Island), New York
 St. Andrew's Church (Mount Pleasant, South Carolina)
 St. Andrew's Anglican Church (Fort Worth, Texas)
 St. Andrew's Catholic Church (Roanoke, Virginia)
 St. Andrew's Church (LeRoy, Wisconsin)

See also
 St. Andrew's Cathedral (disambiguation)
 St. Andrew's Episcopal Church (disambiguation)
 Saint Andrew Parish (disambiguation)
 St. Andrew's Presbyterian Church (disambiguation)